Faizon Andre Love (born Langston Faizon Santisima; June 14, 1968) is a Cuban-born American actor and comedian. He is best known for his roles in the comedy films The Meteor Man, Don't Be a Menace, Friday, B*A*P*S, Elf, The Replacements, Made, and Couples Retreat, as well as the voice of Sean "Sweet" Johnson in the video game Grand Theft Auto: San Andreas and his role as Wendell Wilcox on The Parent 'Hood.

Early life 
Love was born Langston Faizon Santisima in Santiago de Cuba on June 14, 1968. He has described himself as a military brat who was raised in Southeast San Diego, California and Newark, New Jersey because of his father's career in the U.S. Navy. He graduated from Morse High School in Southeast San Diego.

Career
Love got his start as a stand-up comedian at age 15 and made his acting debut in an off-Broadway at the age of 19. His film debut, Bebe's Kids, saw him provide the voice of comedian Robin Harris, who died before production began on the film; Love offered a close vocal impression of Harris. He then had a role in The Meteor Man, starring Robert Townsend. Townsend then cast Love in a co-starring role on his sitcom The Parent 'Hood.

He followed up this role with a breakout performance as the drug supplier Big Worm in the 1995 film Friday. Follow-up films have included 3 Strikes, Elf, Don't Be a Menace to South Central While Drinking Your Juice in the Hood, Money Talks, Wonderland, The Fighting Temptations, and Idlewild. In 2001, Love guest-starred in the Ludacris single "Freaky Thangs" from the album Word of Mouf. The same year, he made a cameo appearance as a bus driver, in the music video for Lil Jon & The East Side Boys' single "Put Yo Hood Up".

Love lent his voice to the video game Grand Theft Auto: San Andreas (2004), portraying Sean "Sweet" Johnson, the leader of the Grove Street Families and the older brother of the game's protagonist. He co-starred in Couples Retreat (2009), a comedy film chronicling four couples who partake in therapy sessions at a tropical island resort.

In 2012, he played Stringer Bell in a satirical trailer for The Wire: The Musical. In June of that year, he started to appear in a series of commercials for Boost Mobile, promoting its new 4G phones.

Controversy and arrest 
In 2014, Love posted a series of controversial tweets in the wake of the sexual assault allegations against Bill Cosby. Defending Cosby against the charges, he used profanity and racial slurs against Cosby's accusers as well as comedian Hannibal Buress, who had been credited with bringing wider attention to the allegations in a stand-up routine. In 2015, Love once again posted tweets in defense of Cosby, dismissing his fellow African-Americans who believed the allegations as "spineless monkeys".

On March 7, 2017, Love was arrested on a charge of misdemeanor assault in Columbus, Ohio. An altercation with a valet had occurred at John Glenn Columbus International Airport, with video evidence showing Love grabbing the valet behind the neck in the baggage claim area and throwing him onto the ground and into a desk. Love pled not guilty, but later pled no contest and received a $500 fine and a 180-day suspended jail sentence.

Filmography

Film

Television

Documentary

Video game

References

External links 

1968 births
Living people
20th-century American comedians
20th-century American male actors
21st-century American comedians
21st-century American male actors
African-American male actors
African-American male comedians
African-American stand-up comedians
American entertainers of Cuban descent
American male comedians
American male film actors
American male television actors
American male video game actors
American male voice actors
American stand-up comedians
Comedians from California
Cuban emigrants to the United States
Male actors from Newark, New Jersey
Male actors from San Diego
People from Santiago de Cuba